Clayton railway station may refer to:
Clayton railway station, Melbourne, on the Pakenham and Cranbourne lines in Victoria, Australia
Clayton railway station, Queensland, a closed railway station on the North Coast railway line
Clayton railway station (England), a closed railway station in Bradford, England

See also
Clayton West railway station, terminus of the Kirklees light railway in West Yorkshire, England